Yangchun, alternately romanized as Yeungchun, is a county-level city in southwestern Guangdong, China, administered as a part of the prefecture-level city of Yangjiang.

History
Under the Qing,  made up part of the commandery of Zhaoqing.

Administrative divisions

Yangchun is divided into the urban quarter Chuncheng and fifteen towns.

The municipalities are:
 河塱镇 Helang Town
 松柏镇 Songbai Town
 石望镇 Shiwang Town
 春湾镇 Chunwan Town
 合水镇 Heshui Town
 陂面镇 Baimian Town
 圭岗镇 Kyu Kong Town
 永宁镇 Yongning Town
 马水镇 Mashui Town
 岗美镇 Gangmei Town
 河口镇 Hekou Town
 潭水镇 Tanshui Town
 三甲镇 Sanjia Town
 双滘镇 Shuangjiao Town
 八甲镇 Bajia Town

Climate

Notes

References

Citations

Bibliography
 
 , reprinted 2000.

 
County-level cities in Guangdong
Yangjiang